Irvington Township may refer to the following townships in the United States:

 Irvington Township, Washington County, Illinois
 Irvington Township, New Jersey in Essex County